Ectomyelois furvivena is a species of snout moth. It is found in China (Gansu, Yunnan).

The wingspan is 25−30 mm. The forewings are dark greyish brown with some white powdering, black along the veins. The antemedial line is invisible and the discal spots are blackish brown and separated. The postmedial line is faint, greyish white and serrated, gently curved inwardly from the costal one-fifth to the dorsum at one-fifth. The terminal
line is black and interrupted. The hindwings are greyish white, light brown along the costa and veins.

Etymology
The species name is derived from the Latin prefix furv- (meaning black) and Latin vena (meaning vein) and refers to the forewing with black scales along its veins.

References

Phycitini
Moths described in 2016
Moths of Asia